Jiří Šejba (born July 22, 1962) is a Czech retired ice hockey forward who played eleven games  in the National Hockey League for the Buffalo Sabres in the 1990–91 season. The rest of his career, which lasted from 1979 to 2000, was spent in the Czechoslovak and Czech leagues. Internationally Šejba played for the Czechoslovak national team at multiple World Championships, winning gold in 1985, and at the 1988 Winter Olympics.

Career statistics

Regular season and playoffs

International

References

External links
 

1962 births
Living people
Czechoslovak ice hockey forwards
Czech ice hockey forwards
Buffalo Sabres draft picks
Buffalo Sabres players
HC Dukla Jihlava players
HC Dynamo Pardubice players
Ice hockey players at the 1988 Winter Olympics
Olympic ice hockey players of Czechoslovakia
Rochester Americans players
Sportspeople from Pardubice
Czechoslovak expatriate sportspeople in the United States
Czechoslovak expatriate ice hockey people
Czech expatriate ice hockey players in Finland
Czech expatriate ice hockey players in Germany
Czech expatriate ice hockey players in Slovakia